Erika Csar (26 July 1961 – 27 January 2010) was an Austrian field hockey player. She competed in the women's tournament at the 1980 Summer Olympics.

References

External links
 

1961 births
2010 deaths
Austrian female field hockey players
Olympic field hockey players of Austria
Field hockey players at the 1980 Summer Olympics
Field hockey players from Vienna